Brenda Joyce (born Betty Graftina Leabo, February 25, 1917 – July 4, 2009) was an American film actress.

Early life
The daughter of Mr. and Mrs. Grafton Leabo, Joyce was born in Excelsior Springs, Missouri, and was known to family and friends as Graftina.

When she was 5 years old, she moved with her mother to San Bernardino, California, staying there through her junior high school years. They moved to Los Angeles, California, where she attended high school. She entered the University of Southern California on a scholarship but transferred to the University of California, Los Angeles after one semester.

Between her years in college and those in film, Joyce was a model for photographers. She appeared "in current magazines -- in new automobiles, using toothpaste, modeling shoes, smiling her way through the glossy life of a magazine girl."

Film career
Although she appeared in many B-movies of the 1940s, she had a prominent supporting role in the major film The Rains Came (1939) opposite George Brent and Myrna Loy, and was cast as Maris Hanover in the film, Little Tokyo, U.S.A. (1942). She is best-remembered as the seventh actress to play Jane in the Tarzan series of films. She succeeded Maureen O'Sullivan in the series and appeared in the role five times.

Her first four appearances as Jane were opposite Johnny Weissmuller. However, her last performance as Jane, in Tarzan's Magic Fountain (1949), was with Lex Barker as Tarzan. Joyce and Karla Schramm, from the silent era, were the only two actresses to play Jane opposite two different actors playing Tarzan.

She retired from acting in 1949.

Later years
Joyce retired "at the peak of her career to raise a family." Later, as Betty Ward, she became director of the Catholic Resettlement Office in Monterey, California, and "helped hundreds of refugees find new lives in America."

Personal life
She was married to Owen Ward, whom she had known "since her junior high school days," from 1941 until their divorce in 1960; they had three children, Pamela Ann, Timothy Owen and Beth Victoria.

Death
Joyce died of pneumonia at age 92 on July 4, 2009, in a nursing home in Santa Monica, California.

Filmography

References

External links
 
 
 
 
 

1917 births
2009 deaths
People from Excelsior Springs, Missouri
Actresses from Missouri
American film actresses
People from Greater Los Angeles
University of California, Los Angeles alumni
Deaths from pneumonia in California
20th-century American actresses
University of Southern California alumni
21st-century American women